Campoussy is a commune located in the Pyrénées-Orientales department, in southern France.

Geography

Localisation 
Campoussy is located in the canton of La Vallée de l'Agly and in the arrondissement of Prades.

Population

See also
Communes of the Pyrénées-Orientales department

References

Communes of Pyrénées-Orientales
Fenouillèdes